The Concert McDuff is a live album by organist Jack McDuff recorded at the Golden Circle in Stockholm in 1964 and released on the Prestige label.

Reception

Allmusic awarded the album 4½ stars and its review by Richie Unterberger states, "For the most part the tunes have a frenetic organ jazz charge, perfect for getting you up and going without a coffee".

Track listing 
All compositions by Jack McDuff except as indicated
 "Swedenin'" - 6:40   
 "The Girl from Ipanema" (Antônio Carlos Jobim, Vinicius de Moraes, Norman Gimbel) - 5:53  
 "Another Goodun'" - 7:57 
 "'Sokay" - 4:52 
 "Save Your Love for Me" (Buddy Johnson) - 3:45  
 "Four Brothers" (Jimmy Giuffre) - 4:30  
 "Lew's Piece" - 7:44

Personnel 
Jack McDuff - organ
Red Holloway - tenor saxophone
George Benson - guitar
Joe Dukes - drums

References 

Jack McDuff live albums
1965 live albums
Prestige Records live albums